"Feels Like the First Time" is a song by American-British singer Sinitta. The song was released in 1986 as her self-titled debut album's third single. The song performed poorly, peaking at number 45 in the UK in August 1986. It spent 5 weeks on the chart, whereas, in contrast, "So Macho" the album's second single had been on the UK chart for 28 weeks in 1986, peaking at number 2.

Formats and track listings
 7" Single 
"Feels Like The First Time" - 3:45
"Feels Like The First Time" (Instrumental Dub Mix) - 3:45
 12" Single 
"Feels Like The First Time" (Special Extended Club Mix) - 6:41
"Feels Like The First Time" (Instrumental Dub Mix) - 6:26

Charts

References

1986 singles
Sinitta songs
Songs written by George Hargreaves (politician)
1986 songs